The Belimau bath is a Malay tradition, observed in the month of Ramadan, especially in Bangka Belitung and Riau. The tradition has been carried down for generations. 

Belimau consists of washing or bathing for physical and spiritual purification using limau water. In the Pacific Islands, the Belimau tradition ended about 300 years ago, but it was revived around 2006. The Belimau Bath ceremony is held once a year, one week before Ramadan.

References

Malay culture